Roman Kopylov (born 4 May 1991) is a Russian mixed martial artist who competes in the Middleweight  division of the Ultimate Fighting Championship.

Background
Kopylov is a five-time world champion in hand-to-hand combat sambo, and has also won several European and Russian championships. He has earned degrees in economics and physical education from Kemerovo State University and Novokuznetsk Institute. His MMA idol is Fedor Emelianenko.

Mixed martial arts career

Early career
He has fought in the World Combat Sports Alliance, Sambo 70, Absolute Championship Berkut, and Fight Nights Global promotions. Kopylov won the Fight Nights Global Middleweight Championship by knocking out Abusupyan Alikhanov on 30 March 2018. He defended the title once against Yasubey Enomoto on 27 December 2018, winning by knockout. In February 2019, Kopylov signed with the Ultimate Fighting Championship.

Ultimate Fighting Championship
Kopylov made his UFC debut against Karl Roberson on 9 November 2019 at UFC Fight Night 163. He lost the fight via a submission in round three, his first MMA loss.

Kopylov faced Albert Duraev on 30 October 2021 at UFC 267. He lost the fight via unanimous decision.

Kopylov faced Alessio Di Chirico on 3 September 2022 at UFC Fight Night 209. He won the fight via knockout in round three.

Kopylov faced Punahele Soriano on 14 January 2022 at UFC Fight Night 217. He won the fight via technical knockout in the second round.

Mixed martial arts record

|- 
| Win
| align=center|10–2
| Punahele Soriano
| TKO (body kick and punches)
| UFC Fight Night: Strickland vs. Imavov
| 
| align=center|2
| align=center|3:19
| Las Vegas, Nevada, United States
| 
|-
|   Win
| align=center|9–2
| Alessio Di Chirico
| KO (punches)
| UFC Fight Night: Gane vs. Tuivasa
| 
| align=center|3
| align=center|1:09
| Paris, France
|
|-
| Loss
| align=center|8–2
| Albert Duraev
| Decision (unanimous)
| UFC 267 
| 
| align=center|3
| align=center|5:00
| Abu Dhabi, United Arab Emirates
|
|-
| Loss
| align=center|8–1
| Karl Roberson
| Submission (rear-naked choke)
| UFC Fight Night: Magomedsharipov vs. Kattar 
| 
| align=center|3
| align=center|4:01
| Moscow, Russia
| 
|-
| Win
| align=center| 8–0
| Yasubey Enomoto
| KO (punch to the body)
| Fight Nights Global 91: Kopylov vs. Enomoto
| 
| align=center|4
| align=center|3:39
| Moscow, Russia
| 
|-
| Win
| align=center| 7–0
| Abusupyan Alikhanov
| TKO (corner stoppage)
| Fight Nights Global 85: Alikhanov vs. Kopylov
| 
| align=center|4
| align=center|5:00
| Moscow, Russia
| 
|-
| Win
| align=center| 6–0
| Luiz Gustavo Dutra
| KO (punch)
| S-70: Plotforma Cup 2017
| 
| align=center|1
| align=center|3:15
| Sochi, Russia
| 
|-
| Win
| align=center| 5–0
| Kobe Ortiz
| TKO (corner stoppage)
| Fight Nights Global 69: Bagautinov vs. Nobre
| 
| align=center|2
| align=center|5:00
| Novosibirsk, Russia
| 
|-
| Win
| align=center| 4–0
| Artem Shokalo
| TKO (punches)
| Fight Nights Global 59: Minakov vs. Linderman
| 
| align=center| 3
| align=center| 4:11
| Khimki, Russia
| 
|-
| Win
| align=center| 3–0
| Islam Gugov
| KO (spinning back kick to the body)
| ACB 49: Rostov Onslaught
| 
| align=center| 2
| align=center| 3:57
| Rostov-on-Don, Russia
| 
|-
| Win
| align=center| 2–0
| José Santos
| KO (punch)
| S-70: Plotforma Cup 2016
| 
| align=center| 3
| align=center| 4:52
| Sochi, Russia
| 
|-
| Win
| align=center| 1–0
| Felipe Nsue
| Decision (unanimous)
| WCSA Combat Ring 18
| 
| align=center| 3
| align=center| 5:00
| Ufa, Russia
|

See also
 List of current UFC fighters
 List of male mixed martial artists

References

External links
  
  

1991 births
Living people
Russian male mixed martial artists
Middleweight mixed martial artists
Light heavyweight mixed martial artists
Mixed martial artists utilizing sambo
Ultimate Fighting Championship male fighters
People from Kemerovo Oblast